Charles Vincent "Vinnie" Chulk (born December 19, 1978) is a former Major League Baseball relief pitcher. He is of Cuban heritage.

Early life
Chulk played baseball at the Perrine Khoury League throughout much of his childhood, and graduated in 1996 from Miami Palmetto Senior High School. That year, he was named MVP and received Best Pitcher Award. He defeated the Southridge Spartans during the playoffs in 1996, the team that had cut him the year prior. He attended St. Thomas University in Miami, where he graduated in 2000, majoring in Sports Management. Chulk played college baseball and received Best Pitcher Award of the Sun Conference in 1998, 1999, and 2000, and the Regional Pitcher of the Year Award in his senior year.

Professional career
Chulk played for the Toronto Blue Jays of the American League from 2003 to 2006. On July 21, 2006, he was traded by Toronto to the San Francisco Giants of the National League with Shea Hillenbrand in exchange for reliever Jeremy Accardo. He was designated for assignment by the Giants on June 24, 2008. He became a free agent at the end of the season.

Chulk signed a minor league contract with the Cleveland Indians on January 15, 2009. The deal was finalized in February. The Indians purchased his contract and added him to the roster on April 11. On May 6, Chulk was designated for assignment. He cleared waivers and accepted a minor league assignment to Triple-A affiliate Columbus Clippers. In October 2009, Chulk was granted free agency.

He was signed to a minor league contract by the Pittsburgh Pirates on December 7, 2009.

In July 2010, Chulk's rights were sold to the Hiroshima Toyo Carp of Nippon Professional Baseball.

He signed a minor league contract with the Oakland Athletics in December 2010.

For the 2012 season, Chulk played in the Milwaukee Brewers organization. On April 28, after going 0–0 with a 3.18 ERA and 10 strikeouts in 11.1 innings, the Brewers purchased his contract from Triple-A Nashville. Chulk was designated for assignment by Milwaukee on May 19, 2012. Following the season, he became a free agent.

References

External links

1978 births
Living people
American expatriate baseball players in Canada
American expatriate baseball players in Japan
American sportspeople of Cuban descent
Arizona League Brewers players
Baseball players from Miami
Cleveland Indians players
Columbus Clippers players
Dunedin Blue Jays players
Fresno Grizzlies players
Hiroshima Toyo Carp players
Indianapolis Indians players
Major League Baseball pitchers
Medicine Hat Blue Jays players
Milwaukee Brewers players
Nashville Sounds players
Nippon Professional Baseball pitchers
Sacramento River Cats players
San Francisco Giants players
St. Thomas Bobcats baseball players
Syracuse SkyChiefs players
Tennessee Smokies players
Toronto Blue Jays players